Major-General William Driscoll Gosset FRSE (1822–1899), also Gossett, was a British Army officer serving in the Royal Engineers. A skilled engineer and surveyor, he did much work on the original British Ordnance Survey.

Early life
He was born in London on 13 April 1822, the second son of Major John Noah Gossett (1793 - 1870) of the Rifle Brigade and his wife, Maria Margaret Driscoll (1796 - 1883).

He was commissioned as a lieutenant in the Royal Engineers in 1840 and was deeply involved in the survey work in Britain 1840 to 1850. He was promoted captain in 1850.

He was for his mapping work elected a Fellow of the Royal Society of Edinburgh in 1850, subsequent to his proposal by Charles Piazzi Smyth.

Ceylon
In 1855 Gossett was made 6th Surveyor General of Ceylon, succeeding H. Chims in this role, and holding the office until 1858. He was succeeded by Charles Sims. He was active in recruiting assistants, interviewing in London; but failed to spot embezzlement by the survey's head clerk.

British Columbia
Gosset then served as Colonial Treasurer of British Columbia, arriving in November 1858. He clashed seriously with James Douglas, from 1860. He also uncovered book-keeping issues, and recommended the dismissal of Alexander Caulfield Anderson.

In the aftermath of the Fraser Canyon Gold Rush, coin was short in British Columbia. In 1861 Douglas sent Gosset, or the assayer Francis George Claudet, to San Francisco, for equipment to set up a local mint in New Westminster; in 1862 Gosset operated the mint. Gosset was replaced as Treasurer in 1862.

In 1873 he returned to Britain to take a more sedate role in a Science and Art Department in London. He retired in 1894.

He died on 19 May 1899 at 70 Edith Road in West Kensington in London.

Family
In 1852, Gosset at Eton, Berkshire married his cousin, Helena Dorothea Gosset (b. 1830), who was the daughter of Isaac Gosset (1782 – 1855) and the granddaughter of James Lind of Windsor. They had one son Ernest A. Gossett.

References

1899 deaths
Surveyors General of Ceylon
1822 births
Royal Engineers officers
British Army major generals